Silverdale is a rural locality in the Scenic Rim Region, Queensland, Australia.

Geography 
Silverdale is located in the Fassifern Valley farming area along the Cunningham Highway.  The eastern boundary of Silverdale is marked by Warrill Creek, a tributary of the Bremer River.

History 
In July 1909, a public meeting was held to discuss the opening of a school in the district; the committee believed 32 students would attend the school. Silverdale State School opened on 23 May 1910. It closed on 28 January 1963 and the students transferred to Engelsburg State School (now Kalbar State School) in Kalbar. The school was at 5382 Cunningham Highway.

At the  the locality and surrounds recorded a population of 434.

Facilities 
Silverdale has one of more than 30 cattle tick clearing facilities in Queensland.

Events 
The locality is home to the Annual Silverdale Show and Sale.

References

Further reading

External links

Scenic Rim Region
Localities in Queensland